Lewis Rhys Collins (born 9 May 2001) is a Welsh professional footballer who plays as a forward for Torquay United on loan from League Two side Newport County.

Playing career
Collins came through the Newport County youth team to make his first team debut on 7 November 2017, in a 2–1 defeat to Cheltenham Town in an EFL Trophy group stage match at Rodney Parade.

He signed a two-year professional contract with Newport in May 2019.

On 24 August 2019, Collins made his Football League debut for Newport in a 1–0 win against Crewe Alexandra as a second-half substitute. On 4 September 2019, he scored his first goal for Newport in the 5–4 defeat to West Ham United Under-21s in the EFL Trophy Southern Group E. Collins played for Newport in the League Two playoff final at Wembley Stadium on 31 May 2021 which Newport lost to Morecambe, 1-0 after a 107th minute penalty. On 11 June 2021 Collins signed a two year contract extension with Newport County.

On 31 January 2023 Collins joined Torquay United on loan for the remainder of the 2022-23 season.

International
In March 2018 Collins was called up to the Wales Under 19 Squad for the European Championship match versus Croatia in Zagreb. On 9 October 2020 Collins made his debut for the Wales Under 21 team in the Euro 2021 qualification defeat to Belgium.

Personal life
Lewis is the younger brother of professional footballer Aaron Collins. The brothers were on opposing sides for the first time on 18 May 2021 for the League Two play off first leg match at Rodney Parade, Newport. Aaron as a striker for Forest Green Rovers and Lewis as a striker for Newport County. Newport won the match 2-0 with Lewis scoring the second goal.

Career statistics

References

External links

2001 births
Footballers from Newport, Wales
Living people
Welsh footballers
Wales youth international footballers
Wales under-21 international footballers
Association football midfielders
Association football forwards
Newport County A.F.C. players
Torquay United F.C. players
English Football League players